Kai Chang (born January 29, 2000) is a Jamaican discus thrower. He won the IAAF 2018 World U20 championships and has stamped his class at numerous international events in his career.

Career
Chang won the Jamaica Athletics Administrative Association (JAAA) Junior Championships and then on July 15, 2018, with a personal best of 62.36m Chang won the gold medal for the discus at the 2018 IAAF World U20 Championships to become World Junior Champion.

In April 2021, Chang threw over 60m for the first time as a senior, and then improved to a personal best of 62.60 at the Jamaican National Stadium in Kingston. He later threw an improved personal best of 63.33 in June 2021, at the NACAC New Life Invitational in Florida. Chang ended the season with a PR of 64.49m, ranking him as the second best in his country for the 2021 season.

He won the discus throw gold medal in the 2021 NACAC U23 Championships.

Personal life
Not much is known about his background.

References

2000 births
Living people
Jamaican male discus throwers
Jamaican people of Chinese descent